Temagami station is a railway station in Temagami, Ontario, Canada.

History 
The station was built in 1907 by the then Temiskaming and Northern Ontario Railway (now the Ontario Northland Transportation Commission), but it burned down two years later and was subsequently rebuilt.

Circa 1907, the station could be reached from Toronto via Pullman coach equipped trains. The trains would leave Toronto in the evening and reach Temagami early the next morning.

The station housed the office, telegraph and signal equipment, ticket counters and washrooms, and two waiting rooms.

The station was altered in the 1940s and damaged by fire in 1976. In 1996 the current renovations took place. The station is now managed by Temagami Station Restoration Trust.

It was a stop for Northlander trains of Ontario Northland before service was discontinued in 2012, as well as seasonal Dream Catcher Express service.

In 2021 the Government of Ontario announced plans to restore service using Ontario Northland Railway from this station north to either Timminis or Cochrane by the mid 2020s.

References

External links
ONR - Temagami Station

Ontario Northland Railway stations
Rail transport in Temagami
Disused railway stations in Canada
Burned buildings and structures in Canada
Railway stations in Nipissing District
Railway stations in Canada opened in 1907